Tagin may refer to:

 Tagin people of Northeast India
 Tagin language,  the Sino-Tibetan language spoken by them
 Tagin (Hebrew writing), decorations drawn over some Hebrew letters in Jewish scrolls
 Tajine, or tagin, a North African stew

Language and nationality disambiguation pages